At the Window is an 1881 painting by the Norwegian Realism painter, Hans Heyerdahl, which is held in the collection of the National Gallery, Norway. 

At the Window differs noticeably from Heyerdahl’s earlier works, which were influenced by the dark, stringent style of the Munich school. This picture showcases what Heyerdahl learned from modern French painting.

See also
 1881 in art

References

1881 paintings
Norwegian paintings
Paintings in the collection of the National Gallery (Norway)